Generation M is a five-issue mini-series written by Paul Jenkins and penciled by Ramon Bachs, starting in January 2006.

Basic plot 
The story takes place after the fictional events of M-Day, in which the character Scarlet Witch uses her powers to cause more than 90% of the world's mutants to lose their power and subsequently die. The main focus of the story is on Sally Floyd, a reporter for the fictional newspaper The Alternative. Sally convinces her editor to let her tell the story of ex-mutants and after the column becomes a hit, she discovers an envelope taped to her door reading "Not Enough Died."  Inside the envelope are photos of former mutants who have since been murdered. It has since been learned that the killer, called "The Ghoul", is in fact a mutant who has retained his powers but is mentally insane.

Plot synopsis 
The character Sally Floyd is a young reporter with a New York City newspaper, The Alternative. Although a good reporter, she has suffered from alcoholism since the death of her young daughter, Minnie. After the majority of mutants lose their powers on M-Day, Sally decides to continue writing a column about them. She visits the hospital where Chamber has been taken. His face and chest are now just a gaping hole, a machine being the only thing keeping him alive. Her column is a resounding success and receives national acclaim. However, she soon receives photographs of mutants who have been killed now that they can’t defend themselves.

The police speak with Sally Floyd about the murders of several former mutants. As part of her Mutant Diaries series, Sally visits former mutants Stacy X and Jubilation Lee. The police then confronts her with a new theory, that the killer is actually a mutant himself.

Sally is contacted by a man calling himself the Ghoul, who claims he is the one responsible for murdering former mutants and wants his story told. Sally encounters Fred J. Dukes, a former mutant known as the Blob, after paying a visit to a former mutant support group. He suggests that she should visit an asylum in southern New York. The next day, she visits the asylum and witnesses how formerly powerful inmates are bullied by the still-powered mutants. Sally departs, only to have the body of a dead mutant girl thrown at her car by the Ghoul.

The Ghoul continues to harass Sally by sending her pictures of his victims. Sally interviews Marrow in the sewers for her Mutant Diaries and then receives a visit from Barnell Bohusk with an invitation to meet one of the X-Men. A criminal psychologist suggests that Sally try to cultivate some kind of positive relationship with the Ghoul in order to create a rounder profile on him, to which she reluctantly agrees. Later, she finally meets her contact from the Xavier Institute, Warren Worthington, who reveals that he has lost his wings. 
 
After talking to Warren Worthington, Sally meets with Dani Moonstar. She decides to do one final article that concentrates on her daughter. It explains how Minnie was a mutant who was growing smaller and younger until she died a few months before M-Day. Sally meets with Warren Worthington again and, as they chat, the Ghoul strikes. The X-Men appear to fight him, but the Ghoul teleports Sally away, angrily berating her for betraying him. Sally does her best to antagonize the Ghoul and then purposefully jumps out of the tower, only to be caught by Angel, who is revealed to have retained his wings after all.

Cyclops then destroys the tower, bringing the Ghoul’s reign of terror to an end. After a couple of days in the hospital, Sally returns to the office and finds that her colleagues wholly approve of her decision to run the story and for catching the Ghoul. The story ends with Sally honoring her daughter by attending and participating in an Alcoholics Anonymous meeting.

References 

2006 comics debuts
2006 comics endings